The Chasle YC-10 Migrateur was a single seat sports aircraft built in France in the early 1980s. Only one was built and it flew for less than 30 hours.

Design and development
The Chasle YC-10 was designed by Yves Chasle and built by Charles Pagès.  It was a low wing cantilever monoplane, with straight edged, slightly tapered wings. Originally these were square tipped and without dihedral but after early flight trials streamlined wing tip bodies called salmons and also dihedral were added. It was powered by a  Rolls-Royce Continental O-200-A air-cooled flat-four engine.  Its single seat cockpit was over the wing trailing edge, with the pilot under a prominent two piece perspex canopy.  Behind, the round section fuselage tapered rapidly to a broad chord, triangular fin.  This carried a deep, tapered rudder and formed a T-tail with its tailplane and elevator mounted on top.  Its fixed conventional undercarriage had cantilever legs attached to the wing roots.

The Migrateur made its first flight on 29 May 1981.  After only 29 hours of flight it crashed at Tarbes and was not repaired. Only the prototype was built.

Specifications

References

Chasle aircraft
1980s French sport aircraft
Low-wing aircraft
Single-engined tractor aircraft
Aircraft first flown in 1981